The 2019–20 season was Arsenal's 28th season in the Premier League, their 101st consecutive season in the top flight of English football and 110th season in the top flight overall. The club participated in the Premier League, FA Cup, EFL Cup and UEFA Europa League.

Despite finishing eighth and enduring one of their most turbulent seasons in modern history, Arsenal ended the season with silverware, winning the FA Cup for a record fourteenth time.

Review
Throughout the summer transfer window, Arsenal completed the signings of forwards Gabriel Martinelli and club-record signing Nicolas Pepe; midfielder Dani Ceballos on a one-year loan; and defenders Kieran Tierney, David Luiz, and William Saliba, the latter of which was sent back to former club AS Saint-Etienne on a one-year loan. What the Arsenal fanbase viewed as lack of budget and ambition from owner Stan Kroenke led many to protest his ownership with the social media hashtag "#WeCareDoYou". Arsenal released first-team players Stephan Lichtsteiner, Aaron Ramsey, and Danny Welbeck, sold David Ospina, Takuma Asano, Laurent Koscielny, Carl Jenkinson, Alex Iwobi, and Nacho Monreal, and loaned out Eddie Nketiah, Mohamed Elneny, Henrikh Mkhitaryan, Emile Smith Rowe, and Konstantinos Mavropanos.

During the preseason, Arsenal competed in the International Champions Cup, finishing 3rd, and the Emirates Cup and the Joan Gamper Trophy finals, losing both. Arsenal started the Premier League with a 1–0 win against Newcastle United, and continued a consistent form of results, standing third at the table at the time of the October international break, as well as advancing to the fourth round of the EFL Cup. However, their results began to deteriorate, losing to Liverpool in the fourth round of the EFL Cup and winning only once in 9 games since the end of the international break. As a result, head coach Unai Emery was sacked on 29 November, and former player Freddie Ljungberg took over as caretaker manager. He led Arsenal to the round of 32 in the Europa League, but had only won once in 5 games, and was replaced on 20 December by Manchester City assistant coach and former captain Mikel Arteta.

Results showed an improvement following Arteta's third game in charge against Manchester United, which Arsenal had won 2–0, and Arteta had signed defenders Pablo Mari and Cedric Soares on loans with options to buy in the winter transfer window. Arsenal beat Leeds United and Bournemouth to move to the fifth round of the FA Cup, and remained undefeated in all competitions in 2020 until 27 February, when Greek club Olympiacos knocked them out of the round of 32 of the Europa League on away goals by winning 2–1 at the Emirates. Arsenal remained consistent domestically, advancing to the quarter-finals of the FA Cup after defeating Portsmouth but remaining in roughly the same position in mid-table in the Premier League.

The COVID-19 pandemic caused all competitions to be suspended from March until 17 June, when Arsenal played Manchester City in a game originally scheduled to take place on 11 March, and lost 3–0. Further defeats to Brighton, Tottenham Hotspur and Aston Villa condemned Arsenal to an eight-place finish, far from a European qualification spot. However, victories in the FA Cup against Sheffield in the quarter-finals and Manchester City in the semi-finals put Arsenal in the final, where they beat Chelsea 2–1 on 1 August to win their only silverware of the season and gain qualification to the Europa League.

Players

 |

Transfers

Transfers in

Loans in

Transfers out

Notes
1. Fee could rise to £35,000,000.

Loans out

Club

Kits
Adidas were announced as Arsenal's kit supplier as of the start of the season. This marked the first time since the 1993–94 season that Adidas have been the kit supplier to the club.

Supplier: Adidas / Sponsor: Fly Emirates / Sleeve sponsor: Visit Rwanda

Squad statistics

Appearances and goals

{| class="wikitable sortable plainrowheaders" style="text-align:center"
|-
! rowspan="2" |
! rowspan="2" |
! rowspan="2" style="width:75px;" |
! rowspan="2" style="width:180px;" |Name
! colspan="2" style="width:87px;" |Premier League
! colspan="2" style="width:87px;" |FA Cup
! colspan="2" style="width:87px;" |EFL Cup
! colspan="2" style="width:87px;" |Europa League
! colspan="2" style="width:87px;" |Total
|-
!
!Goals
!
!Goals
!
!Goals
!
!Goals
!
!Goals
|-
|1
|GK
|
| scope="row" |Bernd Leno

|30
|0

|0
|0

|0
|0

|2
|0

!32
!0
|-
|2
|DF
|
| scope="row" |Héctor Bellerín

|13(2)
|1

|3
|0

|1(1)
|0

|3
|0

!20(3)
!1
|-
|3
|DF
|
| scope="row" |Kieran Tierney

|12(3)
|1

|3
|0

|1(1)
|0

|4
|0

!20(4)
!1
|-
|5
|DF
|
| scope="row" |Sokratis Papastathopoulos

|19
|2

|3(2)
|1

|0
|0

|4(1)
|0

!26(3)
!3
|-
|8
|MF
|
| scope="row" |Dani Ceballos

|18(6)
|0

|2(3)
|1

|0(2)
|0

|3(3)
|1

!23(14)
!2
|-
|9
|FW
|
| scope="row" |Alexandre Lacazette

|22(8)
|10

|4
|0

|0
|0

|4(1)
|2

!30(9)
!12
|-
|10
|MF
|
| scope="row" |Mesut Özil

|18
|1

|1
|0

|2
|0

|1(1)
|0

!22(1)
!1
|-
|11
|MF
|
| scope="row" |Lucas Torreira

|17(12)
|1

|1(1)
|0

|2
|1

|3(3)
|0

!23(16)
!2
|-
|14
|FW
|
| scope="row" |Pierre-Emerick Aubameyang

|35(1)
|22

|2
|4

|0
|0

|4(2)
|3

!41(3)
!29
|-
|15
|MF
|
| scope="row" |Ainsley Maitland-Niles

|15(5)
|0

|3(2)
|0

|1
|1

|4(2)
|0

!23(9)
!1
|-
|16
|DF
|
| scope="row" |Rob Holding

|6(2)
|0

|2(3)
|0

|2
|1

|3
|0

!13(5)
!1
|-
|17
|DF
|
| scope="row" |Cédric

|3(2)
|1

|0
|0

|0
|0

|0
|0

!3(2)
!1
|-
|19
|FW
|
| scope="row" |Nicolas Pépé

|22(9)
|5

|5
|1

|0
|0

|2(4)
|2

!29(13)
!8
|-
|20
|DF
|
| scope="row" |Shkodran Mustafi

|13(2)
|0

|3
|0

|2
|0

|7
|1

!25(2)
!1
|-
|21
|DF
|
| scope="row" |Calum Chambers

|13(1)
|1

|0
|0

|1
|0

|2(1)
|0

!16(2)
!1
|-
|22
|DF
|
| scope="row" |Pablo Marí

|2
|0

|1
|0

|0
|0

|0
|0

!3
!0
|-
|23
|DF
|
| scope="row" |David Luiz

|32(1)
|2

|5
|0

|0
|0

|5
|0

!42(1)
!2
|-
|24
|FW
|
| scope="row" |Reiss Nelson

|7(10)
|1

|2
|1

|1
|1

|2
|0

!12(10)
!3
|-
|26
|GK
|
| scope="row" |Emiliano Martínez

|8(1)
|0

|6
|0

|2
|0

|6
|0

!22(1)
!0
|-
|28
|MF
|
| scope="row" |Joe Willock

|8(21)
|1

|3(2)
|0

|2
|2

|7(1)
|2

!20(24)
!5
|-
|29
|MF
|
| scope="row" |Matteo Guendouzi

|19(5)
|0

|3
|0

|0(1)
|0

|2(4)
|0

!24(10)
!0
|-
|30
|FW
|
| scope="row" | Eddie Nketiah

|7(6)
|2

|2(2)
|2

|0
|0

|0
|0

!9(8)
!4
|-
|31
|DF
|
| scope="row" |Sead Kolašinac

|19(7)
|0

|2(2)
|0

|1
|0

|1
|0

!23(9)
!0
|-
|33
|GK
|
| scope="row" |Matt Macey

|0
|0

|0
|0

|0
|0

|0
|0

!0
!0
|-
|34
|MF
|
| scope="row" |Granit Xhaka

|30(1)
|1

|5(1)
|0

|0
|0

|4
|0

!39(2)
!1
|-
|35
|FW
|
| scope="row" |Gabriel Martinelli

|6(8)
|3

|2(1)
|0

|2
|4

|5(2)
|3

!15(11)
!10
|-
|77
|FW
|
| scope="row" |Bukayo Saka

|19(7)
|1

|3(1)
|1

|1(1)
|0

|6
|2

!29(9)
!4
|-
!colspan="16"|Players loaned out but featured this season
|-
|7
|MF
|
| scope="row" |Henrikh Mkhitaryan

|1(2)
|0

|0
|0

|0
|0

|0
|0

!1(2)
!0
|-
|27
|DF
|
| scope="row" |Konstantinos Mavropanos

|0
|0

|0
|0

|0
|0

|1
|0

!1
!0
|-
|32
|MF
|
| scope="row" |Emile Smith Rowe

|1(1)
|0

|0
|0

|1
|0

|3
|0

!5(1)
!0
|-
!colspan="16"|Players sold but featured this season
|-
|18
|DF
|
| scope="row" |Nacho Monreal

|3
|0

|0
|0

|0
|0

|0
|0

!3
!0
|}

Goalscorers

Assists
As of 1 August 2020

Disciplinary record

Clean sheets

Pre-season and friendlies

Friendlies

International Champions Cup

Emirates Cup

Joan Gamper Trophy

Mid-season friendlies

Competitions

Overview

{| class="wikitable" style="text-align:left"
|-
!rowspan=2 style="width:140px;"|Competition
!colspan=8|Record
|-
!style="width:40px;"|
!style="width:40px;"|
!style="width:40px;"|
!style="width:40px;"|
!style="width:40px;"|
!style="width:40px;"|
!style="width:40px;"|
!style="width:70px;"|
|-
|Premier League

|-
|FA Cup

|-
|EFL Cup

|-
|Europa League

|-
!Total

Premier League

League table

Results by Matchday

Matches
On 13 June 2019, the Premier League fixtures were announced.

FA Cup

EFL Cup

UEFA Europa League

Arsenal entered the competition in the group stages as a result for their fifth-place finish in the 2018–19 season. The Gunners were drawn with Eintracht Frankfurt, Standard Liège and Vitória.

Group stage

Knockout phase

The draw for the Round of 32 was confirmed on 16 December.

Round of 32

Awards

Arsenal Player of the Month award
Arsenal Player of the Month award winners were chosen via open-access polls on the club's official website.

Arsenal Goal of the Month award
Arsenal Goal of the Month award winners were chosen via open-access polls on the club's official website.

Arsenal Player of the Season award
Arsenal Player of the Season award winner was chosen via open-access polls on the club's official website.

Arsenal Goal of the Season award
Arsenal Goal of the Season award winners  were chosen via open-access polls  on the club's official website.

References

Arsenal
Arsenal F.C. seasons
Arsenal
Arsenal
Arsenal